Västra Götaland County East is one of the 29 multi-member constituencies of the Riksdag, the national legislature of Sweden. The constituency was established as Skaraborg County in 1970 when the Riksdag changed from a bicameral legislature to a unicameral legislature. It was renamed Västra Götaland County East in 1998 when the counties of Älvsborg, Gothenburg and Bohus and Skaraborg were merged to create Västra Götaland. The constituency currently consists of the municipalities of Essunga, Falköping, Götene, Grästorp, Gullspång, Hjo, Karlsborg, Lidköping, Mariestad, Skara, Skövde, Tibro, Tidaholm, Töreboda and Vara. The constituency currently elects eight of the 349 members of the Riksdag using the open party-list proportional representation electoral system. At the 2022 general election it had 207,560 registered electors.

Electoral system
Västra Götaland County East currently elects eight of the 349 members of the Riksdag using the open party-list proportional representation electoral system. Constituency seats are allocated using the modified Sainte-Laguë method. Only parties that that reach the 4% national threshold and parties that receive at least 12% of the vote in the constituency compete for constituency seats. Supplementary leveling seats may also be allocated at the constituency level to parties that reach the 4% national threshold.

Election results

Summary

(Excludes leveling seats)

Detailed

2020s

2022
Results of the 2022 general election held on 11 September 2022:

The following candidates were elected:
 Constituency seats - Tobias Andersson (SD), 451 votes; Sten Bergheden (M), 2,270 votes; Patrik Björck (S), 779 votes; Ebba Busch (KD), 3,130 votes; Erik Ezelius (S), 1,499 votes; Jörgen Grubb (SD), 0 votes; Charlotte Nordström (M), 1,373 votes; and Carina Ohlsson (S), 1,599 votes.
 Leveling seats - Ulrika Heie (C), 674 votes.

2010s

2018
Results of the 2018 general election held on 9 September 2018:

The following candidates were elected:
 Constituency seats - Tobias Andersson (SD), 168 votes; Sten Bergheden (M), 2,594 votes; Patrik Björck (S), 1,542 votes; Ebba Busch (KD), 3,232 votes; Ulrika Carlsson (C), 1,399 votes; Erik Ezelius (S), 1,134 votes; Josef Fransson (SD), 231 votes; Carina Ohlsson (S), 1,776 votes; and Cecilia Widegren (M), 2,054 votes.
 Leveling seats - Jessica Thunander (V), 539 votes.

2014
Results of the 2014 general election held on 14 September 2014:

The following candidates were elected:
 Constituency seats - Urban Ahlin (S), 3,453 votes; Sten Bergheden (M), 2,038 votes; Patrik Björck (S), 964 votes; Ulrika Carlsson (C), 1,604 votes; Christoffer Dulny (SD), 1 votes; Monica Green (S), 1,951 votes; Margareta Larsson (SD), 8 votes; Carina Ohlsson (S), 2,120 votes; and Cecilia Widegren (M), 3,402 votes.
 Leveling seats - Annika Eclund (KD), 934 votes.

2010
Results of the 2010 general election held on 19 September 2010:

The following candidates were elected:
 Constituency seats - Urban Ahlin (S), 3,979 votes; Sten Bergheden (M), 1,553 votes; Patrik Björck (S), 1,356 votes; Ulrika Carlsson (C), 1,989 votes; Annika Eclund (KD), 1,054 votes; Lars Elinderson (M), 1,266 votes; Monica Green (S), 2,690 votes; Carina Ohlsson (S), 2,255 votes; and Cecilia Widegren (M), 5,659 votes. 
 Leveling seats - Christer Winbäck (FP), 561 votes.

2000s

2006
Results of the 2006 general election held on 17 September 2006:

The following candidates were elected:
 Constituency seats - Urban Ahlin (S), 2,708 votes; Patrik Björck (S), 1,482 votes; Ulrika Carlsson (C), 1,599 votes; Lars Elinderson (M), 1,785 votes; Monica Green (S), 2,980 votes; Holger Gustafsson (KD), 1,482 votes; Charlotte Nordström (M), 978 votes; Carina Ohlsson (S), 2,195 votes; and Cecilia Widegren (M), 4,827 votes.
 Leveling seats - Egon Frid (V), 592 votes; and Christer Winbäck (FP), 484 votes.

2002
Results of the 2002 general election held on 15 September 2002:

The following candidates were elected:
 Constituency seats - Urban Ahlin (S), 2,167 votes; Birgitta Carlsson (C), 2,361 votes; Monica Green (S), 2,921 votes; Holger Gustafsson (KD), 2,572 votes; Kjell Nordström (S), 4,228 votes; Carina Ohlsson (S), 2,389 votes; Per Rosengren (V), 862 votes; Cecilia Widegren (M), 2,883 votes; and Christer Winbäck (FP), 1,178 votes.

1990s

1998
Results of the 1998 general election held on 20 September 1998:

The following candidates were elected:
 Constituency seats - Urban Ahlin (S), 1,489 votes; Birgitta Carlsson (C), 2,512 votes; Lars Elinderson (M), 2,105 votes; Monica Green (S), 3,221 votes; Holger Gustafsson (KD), 1,020 votes; Ulla-Britt Hagström (KD), 227 votes; Lars Hjertén (M), 2,703 votes; Kjell Nordström (S), 4,712 votes; and Per Rosengren (V), 1,800 votes. 
 Leveling seats - Carina Ohlsson (S), 2,180 votes.

1994
Results of the 1994 general election held on 18 September 1994:

1991
Results of the 1991 general election held on 15 September 1991:

1980s

1988
Results of the 1988 general election held on 18 September 1988:

1985
Results of the 1985 general election held on 15 September 1985:

1982
Results of the 1982 general election held on 19 September 1982:

1970s

1979
Results of the 1979 general election held on 16 September 1979:

1976
Results of the 1976 general election held on 19 September 1976:

1973
Results of the 1973 general election held on 16 September 1973:

1970
Results of the 1970 general election held on 20 September 1970:

References

Riksdag constituencies
Riksdag constituencies established in 1970
Riksdag constituency, East